S. K. Singh was a professor of mathematics from University of Missouri - Kansas City. He received his Ph.D. on the Entire and Meromorphic functions from Aligarh Muslim University in 1953, his advisor was S. M. Shah. Singh was
one of the founder fathers and Head of the Department of Mathematics, Karnataka University, Dharwar.

Notes
 Aligarh Muslim University
 

University of Missouri–Kansas City faculty